Events from the year 1991 in Belgium

Incumbents
Monarch: Baudouin
Prime Minister: Wilfried Martens

Events
 7 February – André-Joseph Léonard appointed Bishop of Namur by Pope John Paul II
 14 April – André-Joseph Léonard consecrated as Bishop of Namur by Cardinal Godfried Danneels
 18 July - Assassination of Socialist politician André Cools.
 25 August - The Belgian Grand Prix is held at the Circuit de Spa-Francorchamps and is won by Ayrton Senna.
 29 September - New government formed under incumbent Prime Minister Wilfried Martens
 24 November - Belgian general election, 1991
 27 December – Léonce-Albert Van Peteghem retires as bishop of Ghent

Births
 7 January - Eden Hazard, footballer
 12 November - Gijs Van Hoecke, cyclist

Deaths
 18 July - André Cools (63), Socialist politician and former government minister
 27 September - Alois Vansteenkiste (63), cyclist

References

 
Belgium
Years of the 20th century in Belgium
1990s in Belgium
Belgium